The Earl of Chicago is a 1940 American drama film directed by Richard Thorpe and starring Robert Montgomery, Edward Arnold, Reginald Owen and Edmund Gwenn. It is the first MGM film in the 1940s.

Plot
To remedy the ill doings of his past, Robert "Silky" Kilmount, ex-Chicago bootlegger who has opened up his own legal distillery, hires Quentin "Doc" Ramsey as manager of his company. Seven years ago, Silky got Doc sent to prison after framing him for a crime he didn't commit.

Doc has no good intentions when accepting the position, just waiting for an opportunity to take revenge. The window of opportunity arrives with attorney Gervase Gonwell, who comes from England to tell Silky that he has inherited land from his deceased uncle, the Earl of Gorley.

Doc persuades Silky to go to England and visit his new estate, but he insists that Doc go with him. Doc sees the opportunity to ruin Silky and tricks him into signing a formal power of attorney document, giving him the right to do as he pleases while Silky is abroad.

Silky lands upon the English culture and makes quite an impact with his gangster-like behavior among the lords and traditions. He gets help from the kind butler, Munsey, and a cousin, Gerald, and soon finds it in his heart to treasure the ancient traditions and the family history.

Back in the U.S., Doc is emptying the company of every cent without Silky's knowledge. When the ceremony to make him a member of the House of Lords is about to start, he finds out that he is bankrupt and prohibited by law from selling his English estate. Silky kills Doc in anger, and is sentenced to death. He will be hanged by the neck with a silken rope in the Tower of London.

Silky accepts his fate and walks with his head held high, as a true nobleman, to the rope and his death, encouraged by Munsey.

Cast
 Robert Montgomery as Robert Kilmount
 Edward Arnold as Quentin "Doc" Ramsey
 Reginald Owen as Gervase Gonwell
 Edmund Gwenn as Munsey, the butler
 E. E. Clive as Mr. Redwood
 Ronald Sinclair as Master Gerald Kilmount
 Norma Varden as Maureen Kilmount
 Halliwell Hobbes as Lord Chancellor
 Ian Wolfe as Reading Clerk
 Peter Godfrey as Judson
 Paul England as Chief Constable
 Billy Bevan as Castle Guide
 Ted Billings as Townsman (uncredited)
 Olaf Hytten as Hodges (uncredited)
 Miles Mander as Attorney General (uncredited)
 Ben Welden as Driver (uncredited)

References

External links

1940 films
1940s English-language films
Films directed by Richard Thorpe
1940 drama films
American drama films
Films set in London
Films produced by Victor Saville
Films with screenplays by Lesser Samuels
American black-and-white films
Metro-Goldwyn-Mayer films
1940s American films
English-language drama films